Nepomuk is a town in the Plzeň Region of the Czech Republic.

Nepomuk also may refer to:
 NEPOMUK (framework), software framework
 Nepomuk (Příbram District), a village and municipality in the Central Bohemian Region of the Czech Republic
 Nepomuk, fictional character in Thomas Mann's novel Doctor Faustus
 John of Nepomuk, Czech saint

Nepomuk is also a part of the following given names invoking the saint:
 Johann Nepomuk David, Austrian composer
 Johann Nepomuk della Croce, Austrian painter 
 Johann Nepomuk Fuchs (disambiguation), several people
 Peter Johann Nepomuk Geiger, Viennese artist 
 Johannes Nepomuk Franz Xaver Gistel, German naturalist
 Johann Nepomuk Hiedler, great-grandfather of Adolf Hitler
 Johann Nepomuk Hofzinser, Austrian-Hungarian magician 
 Johann Nepomuk Hummel, Austrian composer and pianist
 Johann Nepomuk Karl, Prince of Liechtenstein
 Johann Nepomuk Maelzel, German inventor
 Johann Nepomuk Eduard Ambrosius Nestroy, Austrian writer and actor
 Johann Nepomuk von Triva, German general
 Johann Nepomuk von Tschiderer zu Gleifheim, Austro-Italian bishop